The year 513 BC was a year of the pre-Julian Roman calendar. In the Roman Empire, it was known as year 241 Ab urbe condita. The denomination 513 BC for this year has been used since the early medieval period, when the Anno Domini calendar era became the prevalent method in Europe for naming years.

Events

By place

Asia
 Darius the Great subdues the Getae and east Thrace in his war against the Scythians. To accomplish this, he builds a massive pontoon bridge across the Bosphorus Strait.
 Western India, which includes the Indus Valley, becomes the Persian satrapy Hindush.

Europe
 Amyntas I of Macedon submits to Darius and offers women as concubines to a Persian embassy. His son, Alexander I, objects to this and tricks them by substituting the women with clean-shaven men (or 512 BC).
 European Scythian campaign of Darius I

Births

Deaths

References

 
510s BC